Salameh-ye Vosta (also Romanized as Salāmeh-ye Vosţá, and Salāmeh-ye Vostá; also known as Salāmeh-ye Mīānī) is a village in Dorunak Rural District, Zeydun District, Behbahan County, Khuzestan Province, Iran. At the 2006 census, its population was 228, in 53 families.

References 

Populated places in Behbahan County